The 2021–22 Macedonian First League was the 30th season of the Macedonian First Football League, the highest football league of North Macedonia. It began on 8 August 2021 and ended on 15 May 2022. Shkëndija are the defending champions, having won their fourth title in 2020–21.

Promotion and relegation 

1 Renova withdrew from the First League due to financial reasons.

Participating teams

Personnel and kits

Note: Flags indicate national team as has been defined under FIFA eligibility rules. Players may hold more than one non-FIFA nationality.

League table

Results
Every team will play three times against each other team for a total of 33 matches. The first 22 matchdays will consist of a regular double round-robin schedule. The league standings at this point will then be used to determine the games for the last 11 matchdays.

Matches 1–22

Matches 23–33

Positions by round
The table lists the positions of teams after each week of matches. In order to preserve chronological evolvements, any postponed matches are not included to the round at which they were originally scheduled, but added to the full round they were played immediately afterwards.

Relegation play-offs

Season statistics

Top scorers

See also
2021–22 Macedonian Football Cup
2021–22 Macedonian Second Football League

References

External links
Football Federation of Macedonia 
MacedonianFootball.com 

North Macedonia
1
2021–22